Louis A. Ferry (December 1, 1927 – January 25, 2004) was an American football player and coach. He played professionally in the National Football League (NFL) for the Green Bay Packers for two seasons (1949–1950), one season with the Chicago Cardinals (1951), and five with the Pittsburgh Steelers (1952–1956). Ferry served as the head football coach at Villanova University from 1970 to 1973 and interim head coach for the final three games of the 1974 season, compiling a record of 20–26–1.

Ferry dies on January 25, 2004, at Mercy Fitzgerald Hospital in Darby, Pennsylvania.

Head coaching record

Notes

References

External links
 

1927 births
2004 deaths
American football tackles
Chicago Cardinals players
Green Bay Packers players
Pittsburgh Steelers players
Villanova Wildcats football coaches
Villanova Wildcats football players
Sportspeople from Chester, Pennsylvania
Coaches of American football from Pennsylvania
Players of American football from Pennsylvania